Craiginour is a hill located near Cowie Water in Stonehaven, Aberdeenshire, Scotland.

References

Landforms of Aberdeenshire
Mountains and hills of Aberdeenshire